Phoutthasay Khochalern (Lao: ພຸດທະໄຊ ໂຄຈະເລີນ (born 29 December 1995) is a Laotian retired professional footballer who plays as a midfielder.

International career
In 2013, he was called up by Laos national team for friendly match against Singapore.

International Goals 
Scores and results list Laos' goal tally first.

References

External links 
 

1995 births
Living people
Laotian footballers
Laos international footballers
Association football midfielders
Footballers at the 2014 Asian Games
Footballers at the 2018 Asian Games
Asian Games competitors for Laos
People from Savannakhet province
Phoutthasay Khochalern
Phoutthasay Khochalern
Competitors at the 2021 Southeast Asian Games
Southeast Asian Games competitors for Laos